Carrefour Laval (corporately styled as "CF Carrefour Laval") is a super regional shopping mall in Laval, Quebec, Canada. It is located in the Chomedey neighbourhood of the city at the intersection of Autoroute des Laurentides (Laurentian Expressway) (A-15) and Autoroute Jean-Noël-Lavoie (A-440). 

At , it is both the largest enclosed shopping centre in the Montreal area and the largest mall operating on a single floor in all of Quebec. Virtually untouched by the ongoing decline of indoor malls, it typically ranks among the top shopping centres in Quebec for its number of visitors as well as sales per square foot and has been home to many retail firsts in the province.

Stores
The mall has three anchor stores: Hudson's Bay, Simons and Rona L'Entrepôt. Various other stores, boutiques and restaurants are represented in the mall. 

Carrefour Laval has the reputation of being a gate for international retail chains looking to expand in Quebec and is one of the best performing shopping malls in the province in terms of sales per square foot. Several established American retailers opened their first Quebec store at Carrefour Laval notably Apple Store, Bath & Body Works, Build-A-Bear Workshop, Crate and Barrel and Victoria's Secret. Non-American international retailers that had their start at Carrefour Laval include Armani Exchange and Le Creuset.

History

Planning for a new mall (1969-1973)
Construction of the mall was announced on February 27, 1969, by Steinberg's and Eaton's. The consortium announced that a 150-store mall would be built on a  property next to the Laurentian Expressway, subject to the construction of the necessary infrastructure by the newly formed city of Laval.

The project had been delayed after a zoning bylaw proposed by mayor Jacques Tétreault that would effectively have given the Carrefour Laval consortium a monopoly over the development of the proposed downtown core of Laval was challenged by the opposition and by members of his own party, who supported the construction of a second mall in the immediate vicinity by the Oshawa Group. A zoning amendment proposed by opposition councillor Lucien Paiement (later mayor), which allowed the Oshawa Group to build its own mall was adopted. By then, Morgan's and Simpson's had joined the Carrefour Laval consortium.

Timeline
1974: Carrefour Laval opens with major tenants Simpsons, Eaton's, Pascal's and Beaucoup.The L-shaped Carrefour Laval has 125 stores. Eaton's and Beaucoup anchor the ends of the mall and Simpsons is at the junction. Carrefour Laval has three owners: Fairview Corporation, Ivanhoe Corporation and Eaton's. It has a size of 850,000 square feet and occupies a land of 29.6 hectares.
1978: Dupuis Frères closes. Wise arrives in the mall.
1983: The mall increases to  1.15 million square feet by expanding to the west with 90 new stores and a Sears department store of 158,000 square feet.
1984: The Beaucoup concept is abandoned. Steinberg's and Miracle Mart now have their separate anchor spaces, although they remain side by side.
1985: Miracle Mart is converted to  M.
1989: Simpsons is converted to The Bay.
1991: Pascal's closes.
1992: Steinberg's and M close.
1993: Bureau en Gros becomes a tenant of Carrefour Laval. It is located in a portion of the former Pascal's hardware store's. Moreover, work begins to convert the space that had been occupied by Steinberg's and M to accommodate what would have been the first Costco store in Canada, but this is halted when Costco and Price Club merge the same year, since there was already a Price Club store right across the expressway. 
1994: Rona L'Entrepôt opens on what used to be the anchor spaces of Steinberg's and M.
1995: Wise closes. 
1996: Les Ailes de la Mode opens. Like Bureau en Gros, it opened in the former Pascal outlet. 
1999: Eaton's closes.
2000: Cadillac Fairview acquires full ownership of the mall. Until now it had been co-owned by Ivanhoe.
2002: Carrefour Laval expands with 80 new stores and anchor Simons.  This expansion took place on the former spot of the Eaton's store which had been demolished. The new section is characterized on a map as the southern eastern portion of the mall with the shape of an arc.
2008: A newer, expanded food court and redesign of the flooring and ceilings is underway and scheduled to be completed in two phases by 2009. The food court offers now 1,200 seats.
2009: The new food court opens with 22 fast food restaurants, 1,200 seats and an upscale restaurant, Table 51. This results in a small increase of the total size of Carrefour Laval (attributed to the northern part of the new food court) although insignificant in comparison to the mall's expansions in 1983 and 2002. Conversion of the old 1983 food court into retail space begins.
2010: End of the work for the conversion of the old food court
2011: Les Ailes de la Mode closes.
2012: Crate & Barrel opens, in part of Les Ailes de la Mode's past location. The rest is split between The Keg and P.F. Chang's. 
2014: Bureau en Gros closes.
2018: Sears closes.
2019: TD Asset Management becomes owner of the mall at 50%.

Transit centre
An EXO bus terminal is located across boulevard le Carrefour from the Carrefour Laval. From it the STL offers frequent bus service to and from Montmorency metro station, the terminus of the orange line of the Montreal Metro.

See also
Laval, Quebec
List of largest enclosed shopping malls in Canada
List of malls in Montreal
List of shopping malls in Canada

Notes

References

External links
 
Satellite image from Google Maps (up to date image)

Buildings and structures in Laval, Quebec
Eaton's
Shopping malls established in 1974
Shopping malls in Quebec
Tourist attractions in Laval, Quebec
Cadillac Fairview